Lambda Chamaeleontis, Latinized from λ Chamaeleontis, is a star located in the constellation Musca. Lambda Chamaeleontis is also known as HR 4617, and HD 105340. This star is visible to the naked eye as a dim, orange-hued star with an apparent visual magnitude of 5.165.

This is an aging K-type giant/bright giant with a stellar classification of K2II/III. With the supply of hydrogen at its core exhausted, the star expanded and cooled. It now has 30 times the radius of the Sun and is radiating 287 times the Sun's luminosity from its enlarged photosphere at an effective temperature of 4,322 K.

The star was first designated Lambda Chamaeleontis by French astronomer Lacaille, in his Coelum Australe Stelliferum. He listed it close to Pi Chamaeleontis in both brightness and location. The IAU redefinition of the constellation borders in 1930, has placed Lambda Chamaeleontis slightly over the border in Musca, rather than Chamaeleon.

References

Further reading 

K-type giants
Chamaeleon (constellation)
Musca (constellation)
Chamaeleontis, Lambda
Durchmusterung objects
105340
059151
4617